Funkhouser may refer to:

People
Barbara Funkhouser (1930–2014), an American journalist, newspaper editor, and writer
Erica Funkhouser, American poet 
Howard G. Funkhouser (1898–1984) American mathematician
Kyle Funkhouser (born 1994), American baseball player
Mark Funkhouser (born 1949), mayor of Kansas City, Missouri
Richard Funkhouser (1917–2008), American diplomat and oil expert, son of Edgar

Places
Funkhouser, Georgia, United States
Funkhouser, Illinois, United States
Morgantown, Kentucky, United States, possibly originally named Funkhouser Hill

Other
 Funkhouser (band), an American musical ensemble formed by members of American rock band Bridge to Grace
 Several characters from the comedy series Curb Your Enthusiasm